The  is located in Akita Prefecture, Japan. The river flows from Mount Daisen on the border of Akita Prefecture with Miyagi and Yamagata Prefectures in the city of Yuzawa and drains into the Sea of Japan at the city of Akita. The river's drainage basin is essentially the entire southern half of Akita Prefecture. The river is free of dams for its entire length. It is regarded as a "first class river" in the Japanese river classification system.

References

External links

 (confluence with Ibi River)

Rivers of Akita Prefecture
Rivers of Japan